Frank Bohn may refer to:
 Frank Bohn (socialist) (1878–1975), National Secretary of the Socialist Labor Party of America
 Frank P. Bohn (1866–1944), Republican Congressman from Michigan